The Nine Hours Strike was an 1871 labour dispute in the engineering trade, in Newcastle upon Tyne, Great Britain. Its name refers to the engineers' demand that a normal working day should consist of no more than nine hours.

The strike began in August 1871 when the engineers in Newcastle upon Tyne, Gateshead, and adjoining areas of Tyneside, formally requested that their "masters" (employers) place limits on working hours. This request was rejected, and a strike ensued.

It was particularly bitter, and made more so when the masters refused to talk to the employees, only to legal advisors and then brought in foreign workers from abroad including many from Belgium and Germany in an attempt to break the strike. Attempts were made by the strikers to persuade these foreign workers to return home; some (but very few) involved violence.

It was not long before the vast majority of the foreigners realised that they were being used, were reinforcing the system described by some as "industrial slavery" and would lose their jobs anyway once the strike was resolved. Many agreed to leave, provided that their return fare would be paid. The money was quickly raised for this purpose by donations from all parts of industry, including from many far of places within Great Britain.

Many attempts to mediate were made by many parties, but all failed when the masters refused to accept any compromise.
Eventually the masters realised that if they did not negotiate, their only options would be to suspend or close their businesses, thus delaying contracts and facing at the best losing the orders and at the worst contractual penalties.

Possibly more by good luck than judgement, the strike happened at a time when engineering was booming, it was a time of prosperity, huge profits were being made by the masters, order book were over-full and as a consequence labour was extremely scarce even without a strike. Victory was therefore almost assured by the strikers right from the start.

The strike continued for fourteen weeks before the masters succumbed to the pressure, granting the strikers' request for a nine-hour day.

Matthew Dryden, the Tyneside songwriter  wrote "Perseveer " or "The Nine Oors Movement" (written in Geordie dialect and sung to the tune of "Nelly Ray") and sang this in many concerts held to provide funds for the strikers.

See also 
Geordie dialect words

References

1871 labor disputes and strikes
Labour disputes in the United Kingdom
Working time
History of Newcastle upon Tyne
Manufacturing industry strikes
August 1871 events
1871 in England
Conflicts in 1871